Zelenodolsk (Yaşel Üzän; , Parat) is a town in Tatarstan, Russia, located in the northwest of the republic on the left bank of the Volga River,  from Kazan. Population:

History
The city stands on the site of Mari village. In 1865, the town was referred to as the village Kabachischi (the title area of arable land Paratsky peasants "Kabachischenskie field"). Since 1897 the village was called Paratsky Zaton, and since 1928  working village Green Dol. In 1932, transformed into a city Zelenodol'sk.

Since the end of the 19th century, it was the backwater wintering area and repair of sea vessels, which marked the beginning Zelenodolsk Shipyard (now Zelenodolsky Plant Gorky).

As a result of the rising water level of the Kuibyshev Reservoir and coastal flooding during construction of the Kuibyshev hydroelectric station, the coastline has changed dramatically.

Now beginning to be realized the largest public-private investment project to build by 2025 within the territory of the agglomeration of 3.64 ha along the M7 motorway between Zelenodol'sk and Kazan new satellite city "Green Dol" with an estimated population of 100 (hereinafter - 157) thousand, housing stock 4,100,000 m², construction cost 140 billion rubles. with predominantly low-rise, multi-story buildings in the passing of the planned neighborhood Zelenodol "Volga Venice" on reclaimed lands Aysha and continue through Orehovka.

Administrative and municipal status
Within the framework of administrative divisions, Zelenodolsk serves as the administrative center of Zelenodolsky District, even though it is not a part of it. As an administrative division, it is incorporated separately as the town of republic significance of Zelenodolsk—an administrative unit with the status equal to that of the districts. As a municipal division, the town of republic significance of Zelenodolsk is incorporated within Zelenodolsky Municipal District as Zelenodolsk Urban Settlement.

Economy
Due to its location, Zelenodolsk is an important transport hub of the republic. It also has a well-known shipbuilding yard (Zelenodolsk Factory), founded in 1895.

During the Cold War, Zelenodolsk was a secret development base for warships.

References

Notes

Sources

External links
Unofficial website of Zelenodolsk 

Cities and towns in Tatarstan
Monotowns in Russia
Kazansky Uyezd